The following is a list of significant gamma-ray bursts (GRBs) listed in chronological order. GRBs are named after the date on which they were detected: the first two numbers correspond to the year, the second two numbers to the month, and the last two numbers to the day.

List

Extremes

Firsts

Most distant GRB

Notes

Footnotes

References

Citations

See also 
 Lists of astronomical objects

External links 
 Jochen Greiner's afterglow table
 Stephen Holland's afterglow table
 GRBOX - Gamma-Ray Burst Online Index
 Official Swift GRB Table
 Official BATSE GRB Table